The Kattankudy Mosque Massacre was the killing of over 147 Muslim men and boys on 3 August, 1990. Around 30 armed Tamil militants raided two mosques in Kattankudy (Meer Jummah Mosque, Kattankudy-01 & Hussainiyya Mosque, Manchanthoduwai) where over 300 people were prostrating in Isha prayers. The Sri Lankan government, survivors, and observers accuse the Liberation Tigers of Tamil Eelam (LTTE) of committing the crime. The LTTE denied involvement and never retracted the denial.

Background
The Liberation Tigers of Tamil Eelam, is a militant rebel organization which had been fighting the Sri Lankan Civil War since 1976 in order to establish a separate state in the North and East of the country.

Peace talks which began in 1989 broke down ending a 13-month ceasefire. On 11 June the LTTE attacked numerous government targets such as Police stations.

On June 26, 1990 LTTE militants looted 93 shops in Kattankudy, burning 3 of them.

On 24 July 1990 armed persons murdered four Muslims at a mosque in the Batticaloa District. On 29 July 1990 armed persons killed 10 worshippers in Sammanthurai, 25 miles east of the town of Batticaloa. Sri Lankan military officials claimed it was done by the LTTE. They also claimed the LTTE attacked Muslim villages, and burning their shops and homes, on the basis of suspecting them of supporting the government.

Incident
On 3 August around 30 heavily armed Tamil rebels crossed a lagoon and entered the town of Kattankudy. An LTTE tax collector, Ranjith Appah, had visited the house of Jinnah Hadjiaar, where LTTE gunmen shot his son-in-law dead. At around 8:10pm, the rebels entered the Meer Jumma Masjid, Hussainiya, Masjid-Jul-Noor and Fowzie Mosques, where hundreds of devotees were attending Friday Isha prayers. The persons were disguised as Muslims to avoid suspicion.  

As the civilians knelt in prayer when the Tamil rebels attacked them, spraying automatic fire and hurling hand grenades at the worshippers. Most of the victims were shot in the back or side. The rebels fled as Sri Lankan soldiers, notified of the ongoing massacre, arrived at the scene. The army had delayed in reaching the town, citing the possibility of landmines as the reason. This led to some Kattankudy residents suspecting the army was somehow involved in the massacre.

Initial report put the death toll at around 100, but as many of the injured who were rushed to hospital succumbed to their injuries, the final death toll rose to over 147.

Eyewitness accounts
Harrowing eyewitness accounts appeared in the international press over the next few days. Speaking to the New York Times, Mohammed Ibrahim, a 40-year-old businessman said:

Mohammed Arif, a 17-year-old student who also survived the massacre told the New York Times:

Aftermath
Then Sri Lankan President Ranasinghe Premadasa directed Sri Lanka Air Force helicopters to rush the injured to hospitals for urgent treatment. They continued to ferry the injured to hospitals throughout the next morning. Soon after the massacre, government troops launched an operation in the area to capture the killers. One of the helicopters involved in the search shot at two boat loads of LTTE rebels off the sea at Kattankudi. They were believed to be fleeing to India following the massacre. Casualties amongst the rebels were not confirmed.

The incident was the worst massacre of civilians since the resumption the conflict on 11 June. All the victims were buried in a cemetery at the Meera Jumma Mosque, where mourners dug a long common grave for a row of coffins.

LTTE denied responsibility and alleged that it was done by the government to get arms from the Islamic countries.

Sri Lanka's largest Tamil party the Tamil National Alliance condemned the killings as "totally unacceptable". TNA leader R. Sampanthan told the BBC Tamil service:

From this point onwards LTTE committed number of atrocities against Muslim community including the total expulsion of Muslims from northern province.

List of people killed on that day

A R Atham Bawa (43)
H M Meera Lebbe (43)
K L M Mohamed Raffi (17)
A Pakeer Mohideen (65)
M S Abdul Hameed (25)
M A Faisal (13)
M I Jaufar (17)
M I Jaroon (10)
V M Ismail (37)
M M M Jaufar (17)
M K M Sahabdeen (41)
M S M Shukoor
M S M Jawad (13)
M Iqbal (16)
M I Atham Lebbe (52)
M L Mohamed Muthu (70)
M S A Zuhaib Moulavi (20)
I Raffeek (18)
M M Sahibdeen Hajiyar (60)
M A Thambi Lebbe (45)
M M Ashrafkhan (20)
M B Jawad (13)
A M Yasseen (26)
M I M Ajmal (12)
A L Salahudeen (Hafil) (20)
M I Kamaldeen (30)
A L Mackeen (12)
M S M Sahabdeen Hajiyar (55)
M Umar Lebbe (38)
S A Majeed (37)
S H M Musthaffa (72)
Mohamed Anas (13)
M I Abdul Gaffoor (28)
S Zulfikar (17)
Abdul Nawas (21)
N M Ismail (45)
M C M Rizvan (10)
M S Abdul Muthaliff (47)
A Ramlan (30)
M Issadeen (15)
M B A Samad (38)
M K M Ariff (18)
M I Hassan (22)
M I Ashraff (11)
M Kamardeen (12)
S M Hayathu Kalanthar (60)
S A M Imthiaz (9)
S A M Iyansaad (18)
M C M Fareed (35)
M I A Azeez (37)
A M Haniffa (38)
M I Hussain (20)
M L M Thahir (27)
S L M Junaid (23)
M P M Junaid (34)
M M Haniffa Hajiyar (46)
S H M Nazeer (32)
M S A Raheem (26)
Dr R Mohamed Anver (55)
A C M Nasurudeen (40)
M I Ariff (12)
A K Haroon (31)
H M Fowser (14)
M M Ismail (40)
U L Mohideen (17)
A A Noordeen (30)
M T Jauffer (17)
M S M Fowser (12)
A Jauffer (14)
K L M Rahumathulla (42)
P M Mohamed Fazloon (15)
A M Mohamed Mustaffa (70)
S A S Sheriffdeen (Teacher) (52)
S S Seyed Mohamed (Ajmal) (10)
M A C M Buhary (Teacher) (35)
A Sameem (14)
P M Abdul Cader (45)
K M A Azeez (Teacher) (42)
M M Mohamed Fizal (15)
M A Fouzer (21)
A Atham Lebbe (57)
H M Mohamed Samsudeen (40)
M Samsudeen (33)
M S M Akram (6)
M S M Thalhan (8)
A L Abdul Hassan (12)
A L Abdul Samath (14)
M Y Inamul Hassan (16)
P M M Ibrahim (35)
U L Mohamed Ibrahim (28)
M Lebbei Thamby (48)
A L Kachchi Mohamed (Teacher) (56)
A S Abdul Muthaliff (18)
M M Cassim Hajiyar (57)
S M Sitheeque (16)
A M Salahudeen Hajiyar (48)
A M Kalanthar Lebbe Hajiyar (60)
M A M Abdul Cader (40)
M R Abdul Salam (23)
M M Junaid (21)
M A Mohamed Ameen
A Farook (30)
Y L M Hareez (13)
M M Asanar (55)

People injured and died later are not included here.

References

Attacks on civilians attributed to the Liberation Tigers of Tamil Eelam
Attacks on mosques in Asia
August 1990 events in Asia
Massacres in Sri Lanka
Liberation Tigers of Tamil Eelam attacks in Eelam War II
Massacres in religious buildings and structures
Massacres in 1990
Mass murder of Sri Lankan Muslims
Massacres of men
Incidents of violence against boys
Terrorist incidents in Sri Lanka in 1990
Violence against men in Asia
Massacres of Muslims